Frank Henry Wilson (May 4, 1886 – February 16, 1956) was an American stage, radio, and film actor and writer.

Career 
His father was Thomas M. Wilson. Frank started out in show business in vaudeville and minstrelsy. He appeared in many plays, including the original 1927 version of Porgy with Rose McClendon and Evelyn Ellis. In 1922, he appeared in Eugene O'Neill's play All God's Chillun Got Wings and a revival of O'Neill's The Emperor Jones in 1925. He was also cast in Clifford Odets' 1949 play The Big Knife.

He made his film debut in 1932 and later played in films that had stage origins: The Emperor Jones (1933) and Warner Bros.' Green Pastures (1936) and Watch on the Rhine (1943). Wilson made his television debut in 1953 before dying in 1956.

Selected filmography

Family 
Wilson married actress Effie King, the stage name of Anna Green (maiden; 1888–1944), on June 12, 1907. They married in Manhattan at St. Mark's Methodist Episcopal Church on West 53rd Street, a block that was a cultural center for artistic and intellectual African Americans. Effie King, at the time, was a dancer and contralto who performed as a duet with Lottie Gee (née Charlotte O. Gee; 1886–1973), a dancer and soprano in African-American vaudeville circuits. From about 1911 through 1913, King and Gee were known as Ford Dabney's Ginger Girls.

References

External links

1886 births
1956 deaths
Male actors from New York City
People from Harlem
African-American male actors
People from Queens, New York
American male stage actors
American male film actors
American male television actors
20th-century American male actors
20th-century African-American people
Federal Theatre Project people